Alfred Payne may refer to:

 Alfred Payne (cricketer, born 1831) (1831–1874), English amateur cricketer mainly associated with Oxford University and MCC
 Alfred Payne (Sussex cricketer) (1858–1943), English cricketer, played for Sussex 1880–86
 Alfred Payne (cricketer, born 1849) (1849–1927), English cricketer